90th Brigade may refer to:

 90th Indian Infantry Brigade
 90th Mixed Brigade (Spain); see 
 90th Brigade (United Kingdom)
 90th Sustainment Brigade (United States)

See also
 90th Division (disambiguation)